Catasphalma kautziella is a moth of the Autostichidae and the only species in the genus Catasphalma. It is found in Portugal and Spain.

References

Moths described in 1935
Symmocinae